An email storm (also called a reply all storm or sometimes reply allpocalypse) is a sudden spike of "reply all" messages on an email distribution list, usually caused by a controversial or misdirected message. Such storms can start when even one member of the distribution list replies to the entire list at the same time in response to an instigating message. When other members respond,  pleading for the cessation of messages, asking to be removed from the list, or adding vitriol to the discussion this triggers a chain reaction of email messages. The sheer load of traffic generated by these storms can render the email servers inoperative, similar to a distributed denial-of-service attack.

Some email viruses also have the capacity to create email storms by sending copies of themselves to an infected user's contacts, including distribution lists, infecting the contacts in turn.

Examples 
 On 31 March 1987, Jordan Hubbard, using rwall, intended to message every machine at UC Berkeley, but the message was sent to every machine on the Internet listed in /etc/hosts. This message was not an email.
 On 3 October 2007, an email storm was generated at the U.S. Department of Homeland Security, causing more than 2.2 million messages to be sent and exposing the names of hundreds of security professionals.
 In early 2009, U.S. State Department employees were warned they could face disciplinary action for taking part in a massive email storm that "nearly knocked out one of the State Department's main electronic communications systems".
 In November 2012, New York University experienced a reply-all email storm with 39,979 subscribed addresses affected due to an older listserv-based mailing list.
On 8 October 2014, an email storm of over 3,000 messages, including both spam and student comments, reached University College London's 26,000 students. Dubbed "Bellogate", the email chain was started by a prank email sent from an anonymous user pretending to be the provost.
On 26 August 2015, Thomson Reuters, a media and information firm, experienced a "reply all" email storm reaching out to over 33,000 employees. Seven hours later, the original email resulted in nearly 23 million emails. The storm was initiated by an employee located in the Philippines requesting his phone to be re-activated. Employees from all over the globe took to social media trending the hashtag #ReutersReplyAllGate.
On 2 October 2015, Atos, a European IT services corporation, experienced a "reply all" email storm. In about one hour, 379 emails were sent to an email distribution list with 91,053 employees, leading to more than 34.5 million emails. The storm was initiated by an employee located in India, requesting a password reset for a machine.
On 7 December 2018, the Utah state government experienced an email storm originating in a holiday potluck invite that was mistakenly sent to 25,000 state employees, nearly the entire state workforce. Utah Lieutenant Governor Spencer Cox called it "an emergency".
On 24 January 2019, GitHub notifications caused a large number of emails at Microsoft. There is a GitHub group called @Microsoft/everyone that the notifications were sent to. To make things worse, replying to the notifications automatically resubscribed the user.
On 28 May 2019, an employee at the United States House of Representatives sent out a message to an email group called "Work Place Rights 2019". The group contained every single House employee's contact. The email replies lasted over two hours.

References 

Email
Internet terminology